The 1976–77 NBA season was the Kings 28th season in the NBA and their fifth season in the city of Kansas City.

Draft picks

Roster

Regular season

Season standings

z – clinched division title
y – clinched division title
x – clinched playoff spot

Record vs. opponents

Awards and records
 Brian Taylor, NBA All-Defensive Second Team

References

Sacramento Kings seasons
Kansas City
Kansas
Kansas